Camp Verde High School is a high school in Camp Verde, Arizona. It is the only high school in the Camp Verde Unified School District, which also includes an elementary school, middle school, and the South Verde Technology Magnet Academy.

References

Public high schools in Arizona
Schools in Yavapai County, Arizona